John Sargent (1780–1833) was an English clergyman, academic and biographer. Wealthy by background but a country pastor, he was a prominent Evangelical who came to be regarded by others on his wing of the Church of England as an exemplary cleric. He was also centrally connected, by ties to other major Evangelicals of the time.

Life
He was educated at Eton College, where he was a king's scholar, and in 1799 in the sixth form. In 1799 he went to King's College, Cambridge, where he was elected to a fellowship and graduated B.A. 1804, M.A. 1807.

At Cambridge Sargent fell under the influence of Charles Simeon, who shaped his career.  Sargent was also drawn into Simeon's evangelical network. In 1804 he was the intermediary who ensured that Patrick Brontë was able to continue study at Cambridge: Henry Thornton and William Wilberforce provided financial support.

Intended for the law, Sargent was instead ordained deacon in 1805, and priest in 1806. On the presentation of his father he was instituted on 11 September 1805 to the family living of Graffham, Sussex, and from 5 June 1813 he held with it a second family rectory, that of nearby Woolavington.

At Graffham Sargent rebuilt the rectory-house, and on these benefices he lived for the rest of his days, becoming on his father's death the squire of the district. He died at Woolavington on 3 May 1833, and was buried there.

Works
Sargent was the author of a Memoir of the Rev. Henry Martyn [anon.], 1819, with a second edition in the same year, when the authorship was acknowledged; it was often reprinted. In 1833 he brought out The Life of the Rev. T. T. Thomason, late Chaplain to the Hon. E.I.C., dedicated to Simeon, by whom both these memoirs were prompted. Sargent's account of the last days of William Hayley was printed in Hayley's Memoirs.

Family
Sargent married at Carlton Hall, Nottinghamshire, on 29 November 1804, Mary, only daughter of Abel Smith, niece to Lord Carrington, and a first cousin of William Wilberforce. She died on 6 July 1861, aged 82, having for many years presided over the house of her son-in-law, Bishop Wilberforce, and was buried at Woollavington. Their issue was two sons (who died early) and five daughters, of whom the eldest, Charlotte, died unmarried. The others were:

 the second, Emily (d. 1841), married, on 11 June 1828, Samuel Wilberforce; 
 Mary married in 1834 Henry William Wilberforce and died in 1878; 
Caroline married, on 7 November 1833, Henry Edward Manning, and died on 24 July 1837; and 
Sophia Lucy married, 5 June 1834, George Dudley Ryder, second son of Henry Ryder, and died in March 1850.

Notes

Attribution

1780 births
1833 deaths
19th-century English Anglican priests
People educated at Eton College
Fellows of King's College, Cambridge
English biographers
English male non-fiction writers